Ma Dear's Aprons is a 1997 book by Patricia McKissack about the relationship between a son, David Earl, and his mother, Ma dear.

Reception
Booklist, reviewing Ma Dear's Aprons, wrote "As with most loving memories, there is a softening of the harsh edges, but McKissack's words and Cooper's warm double-spread oil-wash paintings are true to the period. They show the exhausting work as well as the proud and loving bonds of family." The School Library Journal stated "The real story is Ma Dear's. Children who have this book read to them will see an African-American woman whose life in the rural south of the early 1900s was difficult but lived with dignity and joy."

The Horn Book Magazine found "There is little plot, but there is plenty of emotion and many details to attract a child. .. Text and illustrations together create a portrait of a family working hard to survive but also finding much to be joyful about."

Ma Dear's Aprons has also been reviewed by Kirkus Reviews,<ref>{{cite web |url=https://www.kirkusreviews.com/book-reviews/patricia-c-mckissack/ma-dears-aprons/ |title=Ma Dear's Aprons |quote=With the aid of Cooper's paintings, McKissack gives real bite to the life of domestic workers 100 years back. This isn't a candy- coated mother-son relationship--Ma Dear is just as quick to tell David Earl ``no more buts, and stop whining, as she is to bestow a hug. But there's love here, cast over David Earl's life with the same uncompromising grace Ma Dear brings to all things in their lives. |date=March 1, 1997 |publisher=Kirkus Media LLC |accessdate=March 29, 2017}}</ref> Publishers Weekly, and the Journal of Reading Education''.

Awards
1997 CCBC Choice
1998 Charlotte Zolotow Award - highly commended
2001 NCTE Kaleidoscope book

References

1997 children's books
American picture books
Books by Patricia McKissack
Atheneum Books books